"All Along" is a song from Elliot Minor's Solaris album, written by Alex Davies and produced by Jim Wirt, who also worked with Elliot Minor on their debut self-titled album. The song is a piano ballad featuring vocal harmonizing by Alex Davies and Ed Minton. This track was not released as a single.

Music video
A video was filmed in a desert and at the Salton Sea at Riverside County, two hours outside of Los Angeles, California. It was made by Tyler Swain from Los Angeles, a friend of the band. The video features the actress Klementine Mellin.

History
Lead singer and guitarist Alex Davies recorded the piano for the song at Abbey Road Studios in 2009.

References

Elliot Minor songs
2009 songs